The Al-Muthanna Club was an influential pan-Arab fascist society established in Baghdad ca. 1935 to 1937 which remained active until May 1941, when the coup d'état of pro-Nazi Rashid Ali al-Gaylani failed. It was named after Al-Muthanna ibn Haritha, an Iraqi Muslim Arab general who led forces that helped to defeat the Persian Sassanids at the Battle of al-Qādisiyyah. Later known as the National Democratic Party, Nadi al-Muthanna was influenced by European fascism and controlled by radical Arab nationalists who, according to 2005's Memories of State, "formed the core of new radicals" for a combined Pan-Arab civilian and military coalition.

Sami Shawkat
In 1938, as fascism in Iraq grew, Saib Shawkat, a known fascist and a pan-Arab nationalist, was appointed director-general of education.

The al-Muthanna club, under German ambassador Fritz Grobba's influence, developed a youth organization, the al-Futuwwa, modeled on European fascist lines and on the Hitler Youth. it was founded in 1939 by then director-general of Iraq's education (al-Muthanna's co-founder) pan-Arab activist Saib Shawkat (with co-founder: Taha al-Hashimi), and was under his guidance.

He is also famous for his 1933 speech "The Manufacture of Death", in which he preached for the highest calling of accepting death for the pan-Arabism cause, he argued that the ability to cause and accept death in pursuit of pan-Arab ideals was the highest calling. It has been said, that Shawkat's path (ideology and military youth movement), influenced the Popular Army and youth organizations of the Baath Party, which appeared much later on.

Yunis al-Sabawi
Yunis al-Sab'awi (يونس السبعاوي) (who translated Hitler's book Mein Kampf into Arabic in the early 1930s) was active in the al-Muthanna club and in the leadership of the al-Futuwwa. He was a deputy in the Iraqi government, minister of economics. Al-Sab'awi had become antisemitic; on 1 and 2 June 1941, members of al-Muthanna and its youth organization led a mob that attacked Baghdad's Jewish community in a pogrom later named the Farhud.

Yunis al-Sabawi planned even a larger slaughter of Jews but his deportation prevented that. After the British overthrew the coup government, Sabawi was court-martialed for the mutiny, sentenced to death, and hanged on 5 May 1942.

See also
Mohammad Amin al-Husayni
Rashid Ali

References

Arab nationalism in Iraq
Arab nationalist organizations
Far-right politics in Asia
Fascist parties
Fascism in the Arab world
Pan-Arabist organizations
Politics of Iraq
1935 establishments in Iraq
1941 disestablishments in Iraq